Albert Ramos won the tournament, beating Mate Delić 6–1, 7–5 in the final.

Seeds

Draw

Finals

Top half

Bottom half

References
 Main Draw
 Qualifying Draw

AON Open Challenger - Singles
AON Open Challenger
AON